State Highway 322 (SH 322) is a Texas state highway that runs from US 259 in Henderson to I-20/US 259/Loop 281 in Longview.

Route description

SH 322 begins at a junction with US 259 in Henderson. It heads northeast from this junction to an intersection with FM 850.  The highway continues to the northeast to an intersection with FM 1249. Heading towards the north, the highway continues to a junction with FM 2011. The highway continues to the north to an intersection with FM 2204. It continues to the north to a junction with FM 349 in Lakeport. As the highway continues to the northeast, it intersects SH 149 in Lakeport. SH 320 and SH 149 begin to run concurrently to the north until they split in Longview.  SH 322 reaches its northern terminus at I-20 in Longview. The roadway continues to the north as Loop 281.

History
SH 322 was designated in 1939, running from SH 26 (now US 259) in Henderson, passing near Crims Chapel and Monroe, to the Gregg–Rusk county line. In 1944, the highway was extended north to SH 149 south of Longview. In 1967, SH 322 was extended northward to I-20.

Major intersections

Notes

References

322
Transportation in Rusk County, Texas
Transportation in Gregg County, Texas